The Magic Top Hat is a 1932 German comedy film directed by Rudolf Bernauer and starring Charlotte Ander, Felix Bressart and Oskar Sima. It was shot at the Grunewald Studios in Berlin., The film's sets were designed by the art director Alfred Junge.

Cast
 Charlotte Ander as Käte Wachtel
 Felix Bressart as Gottfried Jonathan Bankbeamter
 Oskar Sima as Generaldirektor Andreas
 Adele Sandrock as Edith, seine Schwester
 Karl Meinhardt as Delius, Roman-Schriftsteller
 Margo Lion as Olgar seine Frau
 Hans Zesch-Ballot as Alfred
 Max Ehrlich as Schmidt Kapellmeister
 Paul Heidemann as Plank
 Senta Söneland as Fräulein Grieseberg
 Hans Leibelt as Oberregisseur
 Julius Falkenstein as Dr.Pautus Dramaturg
 Eugen Jensen
 Lina Woiwode
 Michael von Newlinsky
 Ilse Gery
 H. von Schwindt
 Erika Fiedler
 Ernst Behmer

References

Bibliography 
 
 Klaus, Ulrich J. Deutsche Tonfilme: Jahrgang 1932. Klaus-Archiv, 1988.

External links 
 

1932 films
Films of the Weimar Republic
German comedy films
1932 comedy films
1930s German-language films
German black-and-white films
Films scored by Bruno Granichstaedten
1930s German films